The Breda Tower is a 30-storey,  skyscraper in Milan, Italy.  The tower was built in 1954 on a design by architects Eugenio and Ermenegildo Soncini, with Luigi Mattioni. The eight floors of the lower body are devoted exclusively to offices, while the rest of the building houses residential apartments. The building is currently under restyling.

Torre Breda was the highest building in Italy when constructed, until 1960 when the  Pirelli Tower was completed. It is now the fifth tallest building in Milan and the 13th in Italy.

See also

List of buildings in Milan
List of tallest buildings in Italy

References

Office buildings completed in 1954
Residential buildings completed in 1954
Skyscrapers in Milan
Skyscraper office buildings in Italy
Residential skyscrapers in Italy